Clairmarais is a commune in the Pas-de-Calais department in the Hauts-de-France region of France.

Geography
A farming village situated in reclaimed marshland, 2 miles (3 km) northeast of Saint-Omer, on the D209 road. The Neufosse Canal, which connects the rivers Aa and Lys, passes by the commune.

Population

History

It owes its origin to the famous Cistercian abbey founded by St. Bernard in 1140.
He gave the village the name of Claromarisco (later to be Clarus Mariscus and then Clermarez) because of the huge marshes and many rivers in the vicinity. The Dutch Klaarmares and West Flemish Cleremeersch names reflect the nature of the terrain, too. Clairmarais became a fully-fledged common in 1790 when the abbey was going to be destroyed and sold as a national asset during the French Revolution.

During World War I, the Royal Flying Corps, and later Royal Air Force, operated from Clairmarais aerodrome.

Places of interest
 The church of St. Bernard, dating from the nineteenth century.
 A windmill.
 Vestiges of the 13th century abbey including the remains of the entrance to the abbey with gatehouse buildings, a chapel and dovecote.
 The eighteenth century Cistercian farm of Cloquette.
 The cave of Notre-Dame de Lourdes which is host to a pilgrimage on August 15. It is the largest in France, north of the Seine.
 The National nature reserve of Romelaëre.

See also
Communes of the Pas-de-Calais department

References

External links

 A Clairmarais website 
 Another Clairmarais website 

Communes of Pas-de-Calais